Hong Ling (27 November 1966 – 7 February 2020) was a Chinese geneticist, professor and doctoral advisor at the Huazhong University of Science and Technology.

Career
Hong was educated at Wuhan University, majoring in biology, where he graduated in July 1987 and obtained a bachelor's degree. In December 1994, he graduated from the University of Arizona with a doctor's degree in biochemistry. After graduation, he started his career as a biochemist at Department of Molecular & Cell Biology (MCB) of University of California, Berkeley. Since March 2007, he served as professor of molecular biology at the School of Life Science and Technology of Huazhong University of Science and Technology. He was studying major and rare human diseases using both human subjects and model organisms such as Drosophila and mouse.

Death
During the COVID-19 pandemic in China, Hong contracted the coronavirus. On 7 February 2020, he died from the infection at Wuhan Union Hospital.

References

1966 births
2020 deaths
People from Wuhan
Chinese geneticists
Wuhan University alumni
University of Arizona alumni
Academic staff of Huazhong University of Science and Technology
Deaths from the COVID-19 pandemic in China